The Thai Entertainment Content Trade Association or TECA is an official company representing the recording industries of Thailand. It is also associated with the IFPI.

Members
 BEC-TERO Entertainment Public Company Limited
 BEC World Public Company Limited
 Sony Music Entertainment Company Operating (Thailand) Co., Ltd. 
 Universal Music (Thailand) Co., Ltd. 
 Warner Music (Thailand) Co., Ltd.
 Spicy disc Co., Ltd.
 Mew Six Move Co., Ltd. / MUZIK MOVE Co., Ltd.
 What the Duck Company Limited 
 KPN Music and Entertainment Co., Ltd.
 Revol Music Creation Co., Ltd
 Hitman Co., Ltd.

References

External links
 Official website

Thai music industry
Business organizations based in Thailand
Music industry associations
Organizations established in 2002